Twelve national teams competed in the Men's Olympic Hockey Tournament at the 2008 Summer Olympics in Beijing, China. Sixteen players were officially enrolled in each squad. Two reserve players could also be nominated to be available should a player enrolled in the official squad become injured during the tournament. Official squad lists were released by the FIH on 24 July 2008.

Pool A

Belgium
The following is the Belgian roster in the men's field hockey tournament of the 2008 Summer Olympics.

Head Coach: Adam Commens

Cédric de Greve (GK)
Xavier Reckinger
Thierry Renaer
Jérôme Dekeyser
Loïc Vandeweghe (c)
John-John Dohmen
Thomas van den Balck
Maxime Luycx
Cédric Charlier
Charles Vandeweghe
Philippe Goldberg
Gregory Gucassoff
Thomas Briels
Patrice Houssein
Félix Denayer
Jérôme Truyens

Reserve:
David van Rysselberghe (GK)
Alexandre de Saedeleer

China
The following is the Chinese roster in the men's field hockey tournament of the 2008 Summer Olympics.

Head Coach: Kim Sang-Ryul

Sun Tianjun
Luo Fangming
De Yunze
Jiang Xishang
Song Yi (c)
Li Wei
Meng Xuguang
Liu Xiantang
Meng Lizhi
Hu Liang
Meng Jun
Yu Yang
Na Yubo
Su Rifeng (GK)
Tao Zhinan (GK)
Hu Huiren

Reserve:
Lu Fenghui
Ao Changrong

Germany
The following is the German roster in the men's field hockey tournament of the 2008 Summer Olympics.

Head Coach: Markus Weise

Philip Witte
Maximilian Müller
Sebastian Biederlack
Carlos Nevado
Moritz Fürste
Tobias Hauke
Tibor Weißenborn
Benjamin Weß
Niklas Meinert
Timo Weß (c)
Oliver Korn
Christopher Zeller
Max Weinhold (GK)
Matthias Witthaus
Florian Keller
Philipp Zeller

Reserve:
Christian Schulte
Jan-Marco Montag

New Zealand
The following is the New Zealand roster in the men's field hockey tournament of the 2008 Summer Olympics.

Head Coach: Shane McLeod

David Kosoof
Simon Child
Blair Hopping
Dean Couzins
Casey Henwood
Ryan Archibald (c)
Bradley Shaw
Paul Woolford (GK)
Kyle Pontifex (GK)
Phil Burrows
Hayden Shaw
James Nation
Gareth Brooks
Shea McAleese
Benjamin Collier
Steve Edwards

Reserve:
Richard Petherick
Nick Wilson

South Korea
The following is the South Korean roster in the men's field hockey tournament of the 2008 Summer Olympics.

Head Coach: Cho Myung-jun

Ko Dong-sik (GK)
Kim Byung-hoon
Kim Chul
Kim Yong-bae
Lee Nam-yong
Seo Jong-ho (c)
Kang Seong-jung
Yoon Sung-hoon
You Hyo-sik
Yeo Woon-kon
Cha Jong-bok
Lee Myung-ho (GK)
Hong Eun-seong
Kang Moon-kweon
<li value=22>Kim Sam-seok
<li value=25>Jang Jong-hyun

Reserve:
<li value=12>Lee Jae-won
<li value=14>Hyun Hye-sung

Spain
The following is the Spanish roster in the men's field hockey tournament of the 2008 Summer Olympics.

Head Coach: Maurits Hendriks

Francisco Cortes (GK)
Santi Freixa
<li value=5>Francisco Fábregas (c)
Víctor Sojo
<li value=8>Alexandre Fabregas
Pablo Amat
Eduardo Tubau
Roc Oliva
<li value=12>Juan Fernandez
Ramón Alegre
<li value=16>Xavier Ribas
Albert Sala
Rodrigo Garza
<li value=20>Sergi Enrique
Eduard Arbos
<li value=23>David Alegre

Reserve:
<li value=3>Franc Dinares
<li value=22>Xavier Castillano (GK)

Pool B

Australia
The following is the Australian roster in the men's field hockey tournament of the 2008 Summer Olympics.

Head Coach: Barry Dancer

, Lambert, Kavanagh, Matheson, Guest, Ockenden, Brooks, Wells. Front row from the left: Brown, Dwyer, Hammond, George, Doerner, de Young, Schubert, Knowles.]]

Jamie Dwyer
Liam de Young
<li value=6>Robert Hammond
<li value=9>Mark Knowles
<li value=11>Eddie Ockenden
David Guest
Luke Doerner
Grant Schubert
<li value=15>Bevan George (c)
<li value=18>Stephen Lambert (GK)
Eli Matheson
<li value=23>Matthew Wells
Travis Brooks
<li value=28>Kiel Brown
<li value=31>Fergus Kavanagh
Des Abbott

Reserve:
<li value=17>Andrew Smith
<li value=30>Stephen Mowlam (GK)

Canada
The following is the Canadian roster in the men's field hockey tournament of the 2008 Summer Olympics.

Head Coach: Louis Mendonca

<li value=2>Mike Mahood (GK)
Anthony Wright
Scott Tupper
<li value=6>Marian Schole
<li value=9>Ken Pereira
Wayne Fernandes
Peter Short
<li value=13>Rob Short (c)
<li value=16>Scott Sandison
Connor Grimes
Paul Wettlaufer
Mark Pearson
Ranjeev Deol
Ravinder Kahlon
<li value=23>Bindi Kullar
Gabbar Singh

Reserve:
<li value=8>Philip Wright
<li value=30>David Carter (GK)

Great Britain
The following is the British roster in the men's field hockey tournament of the 2008 Summer Olympics.

Head Coach: Jason Lee

, McGregor, Kirkham, Dick, R. Mantell, Wilson, Bleby, Tindall, Daly, Alexander, S. Mantell, Marsden, Moore, Clarke, Jackson, Middleton.]]

Alistair McGregor (GK)
<li value=4>Glenn Kirkham
Richard Alexander
Richard Mantell
Ashley Jackson
Simon Mantell
Stephen Dick
Matt Daly
<li value=12>Jonty Clarke
Rob Moore
Ben Hawes (c)
<li value=17>Alastair Wilson
Barry Middleton
<li value=20>James Tindall
Jon Bleby
<li value=24>Ben Marsden

Reserve:
<li value=16>Niall Stott
<li value=25>James Fair (GK)

Netherlands
The following is the Dutch roster in the men's field hockey tournament of the 2008 Summer Olympics.

Head Coach: Roelant Oltmans

Guus Vogels (GK)
<li value=3>Geert-Jan Derikx
<li value=5>Rob Derikx
Thomas Boerma
Sander van der Weide
Ronald Brouwer
Roderick Weusthof
Taeke Taekema
<li value=11>Laurence Docherty
Jeroen Delmee (c)
<li value=14>Teun de Nooijer
<li value=18>Rob Reckers
Matthijs Brouwer
Jeroen Hertzberger
<li value=23>Timme Hoyng
Robert van der Horst

Reserve:
<li value=26>Jaap Stockmann (GK)
Rogier Hofman

Pakistan
The following is the Pakistani roster in the men's field hockey tournament of the 2008 Summer Olympics.

Head Coach: Naveed Alam

, Bilgrami, Saqlain, Warsi, Zubair, Imran, Abbasi, Rana, Rasool, W. Akbar, Javed, Waqas, Ahmed, Maqsood, Butt, Ashraf.]]

Salman Akbar (GK)
Zeeshan Ashraf (c)
Muhammad Imran
Muhammad Javed
Muhammad Saqlain
Adnan Maqsood
Muhammad Waqas
Waqas Akbar
<li value=9>Shakeel Abbasi
Rehan Butt
Syed Abbas Haider Bilgrami
Nasir Ahmed (GK)
Syed Imran Ali Warsi
Muhammad Asif Rana
Muhammad Zubair
Shafqat Rasool

Reserve:
Muddasir Abbas
Shabbir Ahmed Khan

South Africa 
The following is the South African roster in the men's field hockey tournament of the 2008 Summer Olympics.

Head Coach: Gregg Clark

, Symons, McDade, Hibbert, Abbott, Gallagher, Blake, Rose-Innes, Harper, Abrahams, Hammond, Tsolekile, Bam, A. Smith, Cronje, Jacobs]]

Andrew Cronje
Ian Symons
[[Austin Smith (field hockey)|Austin Smith]]
[[Bruce Jacobs (field hockey)|Bruce Jacobs]] ([[Captain (sports)|c]])
[[Darryn Gallagher]]
[[Marvin Harper]]
[[Emile Smith]]
<li value=11>[[Clyde Abrahams]]
<li value=13>[[Paul Blake (field hockey)|Paul Blake]]
[[Eric Rose-Innes]]
<li value=16>[[Marvin Bam]]
[[Geoffrey Abbott]]
[[Thornton McDade]]
[[Chris Hibbert]] ([[Goalkeeper (field hockey)|GK]])
<li value=21>[[Lungile Tsolekile]]
[[Thomas Hammond (field hockey)|Thomas Hammond]]
{{div col end}}

Reserve:
<li value=20>[[Shanyl Balwanth]]
<li value=23>[[Erasmus Pieterse]] ([[Goalkeeper (field hockey)|GK]])<section end=RSA />

References
{{Reflist}}

{{Field hockey at the Summer Olympics}}

[[Category:Field hockey at the 2008 Summer Olympics – Men's tournament|squads]]
[[Category:Olympic field hockey squads|2008]]
[[Category:Field hockey players at the 2008 Summer Olympics|*]]